Madathukulam taluk is a taluk of Tirupur district of the Indian state of Tamil Nadu. The headquarters of the taluk is the town of Madathukulam

Demographics
According to the 2011 census, the taluk of Madathukulam had a population of 178,271 with 88,710  males and 89,561 females. There were 1010 women for every 1000 men. The taluk had a literacy rate of 67.34. Child population in the age group below 6 was 6,805 Males and 6,412 Females.

References 

 

Taluks of Tiruppur district